The  Kansas City Chiefs season was the franchise's 11th season in the National Football League and 21st overall. They improved from 1979 from a 7–9 to an 8–8 record, the most wins for the franchise since an 8–6 season in 1972, but missed the playoffs for the ninth consecutive season.

The Chiefs selected guard Brad Budde, the son of Chiefs Hall of Fame guard Ed Budde, as the team's first-round draft choice, making the Buddes the first father-son combination to become first-round draftees of the same team in NFL history. In a then-controversial move on August 26, the Chiefs released placekicker Jan Stenerud, who at the time was club's all-time leading scorer. He was replaced by journeyman Nick Lowery, who had been cut 11 times by eight different teams himself.

After suffering an 0–4 start, the team rebounded to post a four-game winning streak. After Steve Fuller was sidelined with a knee injury late in the season, former Miami 12th-round draft choice Bill Kenney became the team's starting quarterback. He was so anonymous that when he appeared in that contest, the name on the back of his jersey was inadvertently misspelled "Kenny." Kenney went on to lead the club to a 31–14 victory against Denver on December 7 in his initial NFL start. The defense continued to evolve as defensive end Art Still and safety Gary Barbaro became the first Chiefs defensive players to be elected to the Pro Bowl in five seasons.

NFL Draft

Personnel

Staff

Roster

Schedule

Preseason

Regular season

Game summaries

Week 1: vs. Oakland Raiders

Week 2: vs. Seattle Seahawks

Week 3: at Cleveland Browns

Week 4: vs. San Diego Chargers

Week 5: at Oakland Raiders

Week 6: vs. Houston Oilers

Week 7: at Denver Broncos

Week 8: vs. Detroit Lions

Week 9: vs. Baltimore Colts

Week 10: at Seattle Seahawks

Week 11: at San Diego Chargers

Week 12: at St. Louis Cardinals

Week 13: vs. Cincinnati Bengals

Week 14: vs. Denver Broncos

Week 15: at Pittsburgh Steelers

Week 16: at Baltimore Colts

Standings

References

External links 
 1980 Kansas City Chiefs at Pro-Football-Reference.com

Kansas City Chiefs
Kansas City Chiefs seasons
Kansas